DOS Kampen (acronym of Door Oefening Sterk Kampen) is a Dutch football club based in the city of Kampen, currently competing in the Eerste Klasse.

External links
 Official website

Football clubs in the Netherlands
Association football clubs established in 1926
1926 establishments in the Netherlands
Football clubs in Overijssel
Kampen, Overijssel